The 29th edition of the World Allround Speed Skating Championships for Women took place on 27 and 28 January 1968 in Helsinki at the Oulunkylä Ice Rink.

Title holder was the Netherlander Stien Kaiser.

Distance medalists

Classification

 DNF = Did not finish

Source:

References

Attribution
In Dutch

1960s in speed skating
1960s in women's speed skating
1968 World Allround
1968 in women's speed skating